She Will is a 2021 British psychological horror drama film co-written and directed by Charlotte Colbert, in her feature directorial debut. The film was produced by Jessica Malik and Bob Last, with Dario Argento and Edward R. Pressman among the executive producers. The film stars Alice Krige, Kota Eberhardt, Rupert Everett and Malcolm McDowell, with John McCrea, Amy Manson, Jonathan Aris and Daniel Lapaine.

The film had its world premiere on 5 August 2021 at the 74th Locarno Film Festival, where it won the Golden Leopard for Best First Film. It was released in the United Kingdom on 22 July 2022 by Vertigo Releasing.

Plot
Veronica Ghent, a former film star, goes to a healing retreat in Scotland with her nurse Desi Hatoum after a double mastectomy. The place where she stays is the site where women were burnt as witches centuries before. Their ashes fill the land and give her the power to exact revenge within her dreams.

Cast

Filming
She Will was shot in Aviemore and Glasgow, Scotland.

Release
She Will won a Golden Leopard for Best First Film at Locarno Film Festival, while producer Jessica Malik was nominated for Breakthrough Producer at the British Independent Film Awards 2021 following the film's UK premiere in official selection at the BFI London Film Festival.

Reception
On the review aggregator website Rotten Tomatoes, the film has an approval rating of 85% based on 67 reviews, with an average rating of 6.8/10. The website's critics consensus reads: "More unsettling than truly scary, She Will casts a thoughtful, hypnotic spell made even stronger by its restrained approach and some strong performances." Metacritic, which uses a weighted average, assigned the film a score of 73 out of 100, based on 18 critics, indicating "generally favorable reviews".

Jessica Kiang of Variety described the film as "a superb, sly horror-drama debut delivering otherworldly feminist vengeance", adding that it "administers a potent dose of #MeToo vengeance, all while wearing its nasty sense of humor like a red-lipstick grin applied to a perfectly masklike face". Fionnuala Halligan of Screen Daily wrote that "Colbert is nothing if not defiant, and determined. Others have been here before her, but she's found a new way in."

Meagan Navarro of Bloody Disgusting wrote, "Between the haunting score and Colbert's effortless style, She Will eschews a conventional narrative and instead casts an atmospheric spell through tactile, dreamy visuals." Director Alfonso Cuarón has said that the film "sits in the tradition of great psychological horror films [which] leaves one questioning long after [it] is finished."

References

External links
 
 

2020s English-language films
2020s psychological horror films
2021 directorial debut films
2021 drama films
2021 horror films
British horror drama films
British psychological horror films
Films scored by Clint Mansell
Films set in Scotland
Films shot in Glasgow
2020s British films